National Secondary Route 136, or just Route 136 (or ) is a National Road Route of Costa Rica, located in the San José, Alajuela provinces.

Description
In San José province the route covers Puriscal canton (Santiago, Desamparaditos districts), Mora canton (Colón, Piedras Negras, Picagres districts).

In Alajuela province the route covers Alajuela canton (Turrúcares, Garita districts).

References

Highways in Costa Rica